Cephalotaxus latifolia is a coniferous shrub or small tree in the family Taxaceae. It is native to southern China and is similar in appearance to both C. sinensis and C. harringtonii.

References

Flora of China
latifolia
Least concern plants